The Institut National du Football de Vichy, more commonly known as INF Vichy, was a football academy based in Vichy, France. Founded in 1972 by the French Football Federation, it was dissolved in 1990. The academy had a team that competed in the Division 3.

History 
The Institut National du Football de Vichy opened its doors on 6 November 1972. It was an initiative made by the French Football Federation, in cooperation with the Groupement du Football Professionnel and the Union Nationale des Footballeurs Professionels. INF Vichy would include 40 players over the age of 16 in its first year. 

The first director of the CREPS housing and of INF Vichy was Jean Forestier. The technical management fell to Pierre Pibarot, supported by the coaches , Francisco Filho, Gérard Banide, and Philippe Troussier. INF Vichy was included in the national championships of France at both youth and senior level. 

Initially, INF Vichy's team played only friendly matches. However, from the 1973–74 season onwards, the team played in the Division 3, with two reserve sides participating in the Division 4 and Division d'Honneur.  

In 1990, INF Vichy closed its doors. Over the course of its 18-year history, the academy helped several dozen players make it professional.

Academy 
Each year, INF Vichy received 200 to 300 players, but only 30 or so were selected to join the academy in July. However, there would only be around 15 players that would leave the academy for a professional club three years later. The players were aged 16 to 18.

The normal duration of studies were three years, and on the side of learning to become footballers, players received accounting, commerce, or mathematics classes. The best players would go play with the team in the Division 3. Each coach was responsable (manager) of one generation of players, and would follow them during their three years of study. Although the primary goal of INF Vichy was to train players to help them become professional, the academy also had the goal of preparing its players should they fail to make it professionally, and for their post-retirement careers.

Team 
Starting in 1973, INF Vichy had a team that participated in the Division 3, the third tier of French football. The team consisted of the academy's best young players, and gave them an experience in competitive football. The results were not of great importance, as the team could neither be relegated or promoted. Since the team was an academy team with minors in it, it could not become professional, and therefore promotion to the Division 2 was not handed to INF Vichy despite winning the Division 3 on two occasions (in the 1978–79 and 1982–83 seasons). The furthest round that the team reached in the Coupe de France was the round of 64, which they reached on four occasions.

Honours

Notable people

Notable instructors 

 1972–1976:  Gérard Banide (instructor and coach)
 1986–1990:  Christian Damiano (coach)
 1972–????:  Pierre Pibarot (technical director)
 1973–1976:  Pierre Barlaguet
  Francisco Filho
 1976–1981:  Pierre Mosca
 1983–1984:  Philippe Troussier
 1986–1990:  Christian Damiano
  Pierre Michelin

Notable players 

  Frédéric Dobraje
  Paul Marchioni
  Erick Mombaerts
  Guy Dussaud
  Jean-Luc Ettori
  
  Jean-Pierre Truqui
  
  Christian Borel
  
  Dominique Chevalier
  Didier Christophe
  Guy Genet
 Robert Jacques
 
 Simeï Ihily
 Bruno Mignot
 
 Alain Couriol
 
 Patrick Rey
 Albert Cartier
 Dragan Cvetković
 Jean-Luc Le Magueresse
 Pascal Mariini
 Jean-Michel Raymond
 
 Pierre Bianconi
 
 Didier Danio
 Pascal Malbeaux
 Pascal Olmeta
 Frédéric Antonetti
 Alain Casanova
 Jean-Michel Simonella
 Noël Vidot
 
 
 Jacques Philip
 Philippe Sence
 
 
 
 
 
 Jean-Pierre Papin
 Didier Tholot
 
 
 David Marraud
 Yves Mangione
 Éric Assadourian
 Claude Barrabé
 Nicolas Dehon 
 
 
 Hubert Fournier
 
 Bruno Valencony
 Emmanuel Hutteau
 Patrice Marseillou
 François Fontaine
 Olivier Pickeu
 Guillaume Warmuz
 
 Fabrice Grange
 Fabrice Asencio
 Benoît Beaumet
 Antoine Cervetti
 Christian Bracconi
 Marc Culetto
 Victor Da Silva
 Grégory Delgado
 Christian Skubiszewski
 Pierre-Yves Thomas
 Franck Vallade
 Daniel Wilczynski
 Franck Dumas
 Alain Durand
 
 Philippe Gallas
 Alain Grumelon
 Sylver Hoffer
 Didier Knayer
 Patrice Loiseau
 Giuseppe Montibeller
 Dominique Ottato
 Patrick Payre
 Patrick Périon
 Jean-Marc Philippon
 Olivier Potet
 David Robert
 Michel Sanchez
 Éric Martin

References

External links 
 INF Vichy on FootballDatabase.eu
 INF Vichy on WorldFootball.net

INF Vichy
1972 establishments in France
Association football clubs established in 1972
 
Association football training grounds in France
National football academies
Association football clubs disestablished in 1990
1990 disestablishments in France
Football clubs in Auvergne-Rhône-Alpes